

t
T-diet. Redirects to phentermine
T-Gesic
T-Phyl
T-Stat

ta

tab-tag
Tab-Profen
tabalumab (USAN, INN)
taberminogene vadenovec (USAN)
tabilautide (INN)
tabimorelin (INN)
Tabron
tacalcitol (INN)
Tacaryl
Tace
tacedinaline (USAN)
taclamine (INN)
tacrine (INN)
tacrolimus (INN)
Tadalafil
tadalafil (INN)
tadekinig alfa (INN)
tadocizumab (USAN)
tafamidis (USAN, INN)
tafluprost (USAN)
tafoxiparin sodium (INN)
Tagamet
taglutimide (INN)
tagorizine (INN)
Tagrisso

tal
talabostat (USAN)
Talacen
talactoferrin alfa (USAN)
talaglumetad hydrochloride (USAN)
talampanel (INN)
talampicillin (INN)
talaporfin (INN)
talarozole (USAN, INN)
talastine (INN)
talbutal (INN)
taleranol (INN)
talibegron (INN)
taliglucerase alfa (INN)
talimogene laherparepvec (INN)
talinolol (INN)
talipexole (INN)
talisomycin (INN)
talizumab (USAN)
tallimustine (INN)
talmapimod (USAN, INN)
talmetacin (INN)
talmetoprim (INN)
talniflumate (INN)
Talohexal (Hexal Australia) [Au]. Redirects to citalopram.
talopram (INN)
talosalate (INN)
talotrexin ammonium (USAN)
taloximine (INN)
talsaclidine (INN)
talsupram (INN)
taltirelin (INN)
taltobulin (USAN)
taltrimide (INN)
taluglucerase alfa (USAN)
talviraline (INN)
Talwin

tam-tap
Tambocor
tameridone (INN)
tameticillin (INN)
tametraline (INN)
tamibarotene (INN)
Tamiflu
tamitinol (INN)
tamixaban (INN)
tamolarizine (INN)
tamoxifen (INN)
tampramine (INN)
tamsulosin (INN)
tanaproget (USAN)
tandamine (INN)
Tandearil
tandospirone (INN)
tandutinib (USAN)
taneptacogin alfa (INN)
tanespimycin (USAN)
tanexaban (USAN)
tanezumab (USAN, INN)
taniplon (INN)
Tantum
Tao
Tapazole
tapentadol (USAN)
taplitumomab paptox (INN)
taprenepag (USAN, INN)
taprostene (INN)

tar-tax
Tarabine PFS
Taractan
tarafenacin (USAN)
taranabant (INN)
tarazepide (INN)
tarenflurbil (USAN)
targinine (INN)
Targretin
Targretin (Ligand Pharmaceuticals)
taribavirin (USAN)
tariquidar (USAN)
Tarka. Redirects to Trandolapril/verapamil.
Tarsum
tasidotin (USAN, INN)
tasimelteon (USAN, INN)
tasisulam (USAN, (INN)
Tasmar
tasocitinib (USAN, INN)
tasonermin (INN)
tasosartan (INN)
taspoglutide (USAN, (INN)
tasquinimod (INN)
tasuldine (INN)
Tatum-T
taurine (INN)
taurolidine (INN)
tauromustine (INN)
tauroselcholic acid (INN)
taurosteine (INN)
taurultam (INN)
tavaborole (USAN)
Tavist
Taxol (Bristol-Myers Squibb)
Taxotere (Sanofi-Aventis) redirects to docetaxel''

taztazadolene (INN)tazanolast (INN)tazarotene (INN)tazasubrate (INN)tazeprofen (INN)TazicefTazidimetazifylline (INN)taziprinone (INN)tazobactam (INN)Tazocintazofelone (INN)tazolol (INN)tazomeline (INN)TazoracTaztia XTtc-tdTc 99m-LungaggregateTCNTDF'''